The Commonwealth Transportation Board, formerly the State Highway and Transportation Board, regulates and funds transportation in Virginia. 

It supervises the Virginia Department of Transportation (VDOT), the Department of Rail and Public Transportation (DPRT), the Department of Aviation (DOAV), the Department of Motor Vehicles (DMV), the Virginia Port Authority, the Motor Vehicle Dealer Board, and the Virginia Commercial Space Flight Authority (VCSFA).

Membership
The Board consists of seventeen members:
The Secretary of Transportation
The Commissioner of the Virginia Department of Transportation
The Director of the Virginia Department of Rail and Public Transportation
Fourteen citizen members

The citizen members are appointed by the Governor to four-year terms, subject to confirmation by the General Assembly, and removable from office by the Governor at his pleasure. The Secretary of Transportation serves as chairman of the Board.

Authority
The Board has power to:

Choose locations of routes
Award contracts for construction, maintenance, and improvement of roads
Make traffic regulations
Name highways
Enter into contracts with local entities created for transportation purposes
Contract with other states
Administer, distribute, and allocate funds in the Transportation Trust Fund
Regulate outdoor theaters

All of these powers must be exercised within the framework of state law.

Highway rest stops
As of 2008, Virginia operated 42 rest stops and visitor centers along its interstate highways.  In response to budget pressures, the Board sought public input and determined to reduce costs by closing 19 rest stops and expanding the truck parking lots at the remaining stops to accommodate the trucks that would other park and sleep at the stops designated for closing. The Board also removed the two-hour limit on truck parking. The closures began on July 21, 2009  The Board's funding options were limited, because Federal law  23 U.S.C. §111 prohibits commercialization of interstate highway rest stops. The closing resulted in a $9 million annual saving.  At the Board's first meeting in January 2010, it reversed the decision to close the rest stops and reassigned $3 million in highway maintenance funds to keep the 19 rest stops open until the end of the fiscal year. No long-term funding source was identified.

External links
Commonwealth Transportation Board's website
§ 33.1-1. State Highway and Transportation Board continued as Commonwealth Transportation Board; number and terms of members; removal from office; vacancies.
§ 33.1-12. General powers and duties of Board, etc.; definitions.

References

Transportation in Virginia
State agencies of Virginia